Nelson Raymond Greene (October 7, 1922 – October 2, 2004) was an American football player who played at the tackle position on both offense and defense. He played college football for Tulsa and professional football for the New York Yankees in 1949.

Early years
Greene was born in 1922 in Yukno or Shawnee, Oklahoma. He attended Shawnee High School in Oklahoma.

College football and military service
Greene played college football at Tulsa in 1942, 1946, and 1947. His college career was interrupted by service in the United States Marine Corps during World War II. In his final year of college football, he accepted an invitation to play in the 1948 East-West Shrine Game in San Francisco.

Professional football
He was drafted by the New York Giants in the fifth round (34th overall pick) of the 1947 NFL Draft but did not play for the Giants. Instead, he played in the All-America Football Conference (AAFC) for the New York Yankees during their 1948 season, appearing in a total of 13 games. He also appeared in nine games for the Paterson Panthers in 1949.

Later years
He died in 2004 in Shawnee, Oklahoma, at age 81.

References

1922 births
2004 deaths
New York Yankees (AAFC) players
Tulsa Golden Hurricane football players
Players of American football from Oklahoma
Sportspeople from Shawnee, Oklahoma
United States Marine Corps personnel of World War II